Patna Pirates (PTP) is a kabaddi team based in Patna, Bihar that plays in the Pro Kabaddi League. The team is led by Neeraj Kumar and coached by Ravi Shetty. Their home ground is the Patliputra Sports Complex. The Pirates are the most successful team in PKL history with a record of winning 3 out of 8 titles and winning all of them in successive. They are also one time runners up in season 8 of pkl which started after the COVID-19 pandemic.

The Pirates won their first title by defeating defending champions U Mumba in 2016 (January),  after reaching the semi finals in the previous two seasons (2014 and 2015). In the following 2016 (June) season, Patna Pirates defeated the Jaipur Pink Panthers, thus becoming the first team in PKL history to successfully defend their title and later completed a hat-trick of titles by defeating Gujarat Fortune Giants in the final of the 2017 tournament. The 2018-19 season was a contrasting season for the usually successful Patna Pirates, as the 3-time defending champions crashed out in the group stages, thus failing to make the playoffs for the first time ever. Patna is also the first team to play 100 Pro Kabaddi matches.

Identity

Logo and mascot
The Patna logo depicts a pirate with a green body and a purple beard-mustache. He is wearing a black tricorne and Eye patch.
A pirate poses with angry and aggressive face.

Franchise history

Pro Kabaddi League (PKL) is a professional kabaddi league in India, based on the format of the Indian Premier League T20 cricket tournament. The first edition of the tournament was played in 2014 with eight franchises representing various cities in India. Patna Pirates is a Patna based franchise owned by Rajesh Shah.

Current squad

Seasons

Season I

Patna Pirates got the 3rd spot in the first season. They were led by Rakesh Kumar (currently coach of Haryana Steelers).

Season II

Patna Pirates got the 4th spot in the second season.

Season III 

This season Patna Pirates finished the league as champions defeating U Mumba in a nail-biting match by 3 close points.

Season IV

This season Patna Pirates successfully defended their title in the presence of Dubki King Pardeep Narwal and became 2-time champions of PKL.

Season V 

This season Patna Pirates retained Pardeep Narwal before the auction. Pardeep Narwal has also scored fastest 50 raid points in the history of Pro Kabaddi League in just 4 matches. He also became the first player to score 100 points with an average of 12.77 in 9 matches. Now he is the Top Raider of Pro Kabaddi Season 5 with 369 raid points. In his playoff with Haryana, Pardeep broke 4 records in one day:-
1. 34 raid points in a single match.
2. Team making most overall points in just one match - 69.
3. Triple century in one season.
4. 8 raid points in a single raid.

Patna Pirates beat Gujarat Fortune Giants to become champions for the third time.
Patna Pirates is the only team to win 3 titles in a row.

Season VI
Patna pirates have retained Pardeep Narwal, Vijay, Jawahar Dagar and Manish.

Season VII
This season they have retained Pardeep Narwal again, but released Manish and retained Vikash Jaglan instead

Season VIII

Season IX

 bali the Don

Records

Overall results Pro Kabbaddi season

By opposition
''Note: Table lists in alphabetical order.

Sponsors

References 

Pro Kabaddi League teams
Sport in Patna
2014 establishments in Bihar
Kabaddi clubs established in 2014